Arthur Talmage Abernethy (October 10, 1872 – May 15, 1956) was a writer, theologian, and poet. He pastored several churches, contributed articles and poems to newspapers around the United States, and was named by Governor R. Gregg Cherry as the first North Carolina Poet Laureate in 1948.

Biography

Early life and education
Abernethy was born October 10, 1872, in Rutherford College, North Carolina, a town named for the college of which his grandfather was founder and president. Born the fifth son to Rev. Robert Labon and Mary Ann Hayes Abernethy. Arthur proved to be a precocious child, teaching himself telegraphy by the age of nine and passing the exams to get his A.B. degree from Rutherford at the age of 14. He was denied this degree, however, due to his age. He remained at Rutherford College becoming professor of Latin in 1887 (making him one of the youngest professors in the nation), teaching there for several years. Already a Latin and Greek scholar, he went on to receive his A.M. degree from Trinity College (now Duke University) in 1891 and his doctoral degree from Johns Hopkins University.

Journalism and activism
Abernethy soon turned his attention to journalism, becoming editor of The Telegrapher from 1895 to 1897 and a biographical writer for The Philadelphia Record from 1897 to 1899. He befriended Edgar Wilson Nye who was an adviser to him. He contributed columns to The Charlotte Observer as well as newspapers around the country including Milwaukee, Pittsburgh, New York and Philadelphia. Some of his work appeared in Collier's Weekly.

He married several times, the last time to widow Edna Beatty Lachot of Pennsylvania. She had two children and Abernethy adopted her daughter Anna Mary. He met his wife while serving as business manager for the Philadelphia College of Commerce.

Abernethy was active in politics and the Prohibition movement. He ran for United States House of Representatives in 1928 as an anti-Al Smith candidate, losing in the Democratic primary to incumbent Alfred L. Bulwinkle.

He was instrumental in helping establish a Carnegie library in Rutherford College, the first free public library in Burke County.

In 1938, US President Franklin D. Roosevelt named him an "American Ambassador of Sunshine." That same year, Governor Clyde R. Hoey declared Abernethy to be an honorary citizen for life of Charlotte, Hickory, Asheville, and Valdese, North Carolina.

Later life and poet laureateship
Abernethy turned to the ministry later in life, becoming pastor of several churches including First Methodist Church, Belmont, New York; a church in Cincinnati, Ohio; and just prior to retirement, Asheville Christian Church. He returned to North Carolina, becoming mayor of the town of Rutherford College for a time and a magistrate. As magistrate and later, Justice of the Peace, he frequently filed his reports with the Clerk of Court in verse.

Throughout his life, Abernethy wrote many books and had many poems published. By his own account, he had written 50 books and over 3,000 poems. Abernethy was close friends with North Carolina Governor R. Gregg Cherry who appointed him to the poet laureate position in November 1948. Originally, the term of office was supposed to last only a few weeks—until the end of Cherry's governorship—but Abernethy was reappointed by the next governor, William Kerr Scott, remaining in the post until Governor William B. Umstead appointed James Larkin Pearson. It is notable that even though he was named poet laureate, Abernethy had never published any poetry in book form.

Abernethy died in Asheville, North Carolina on May 15, 1956, and is buried at Rutherford College Cemetery.

Notable relatives
He was a cousin to Charles Laban Abernethy, a Democratic congressman from North Carolina.

Works
Abernethy wrote many books, generally of a religious nature, but was best known for his regional stories and sketches.
 The Hell You Say!: A Novel (1893)
 Mechanics and Practice of Electric Telegraph (1891)
 Bertie and Clara (1896)
 The Jew a Negro; Being a Study of the Jewish Ancestry from an Impartial Standpoint Dixie  Publishing Company, Moravian Falls, North Carolina (1910)
 Center-Shots at Sin (1918)
 Twenty-five Best Sermons (1920)
 Moonshine: Being Appalachia's Arabian Nights (1924)
 The Apostles' Creed: A Romance in Religion (1925)
 Christian's Treasure Island: A Restoration Romance (1927)
 A Royal Southern Family (historical romance based on his family history; 1934)
 Where are Our Dead? (1935)

Abernethy also authored pamphlets including:
 Did Washington Aspire to be King? (1910)

References

External links
 

1872 births
1956 deaths
Poets from North Carolina
Poets Laureate of North Carolina
American newspaper journalists
American Christian theologians
Duke University Trinity College of Arts and Sciences alumni
Johns Hopkins University alumni
People from Burke County, North Carolina